Thomas Hutton Bremner (18 July 1912 – 12 September 1969) was a Scottish footballer who played in the Scottish League for Queen's Park, Motherwell and Hamilton Academical as an inside forward. He represented Scotland at amateur level and made one appearance for the Scottish League XI. Bremner was described as "a naturally clever footballer, versatile enough to play in any of the forward positions”.

Personal life 
Bremner's younger brother Gordon also became a professional footballer. Bremner served as a lieutenant in the Seaforth Highlanders during the Second World War and saw action during the Italian Campaign.

Honours 
Aberdeen
 Mitchell Cup: 1944–45

Career statistics

References

1912 births
1969 deaths
Footballers from Glasgow
People from Cathcart
Scottish footballers
Association football inside forwards
Queen's Park F.C. players
Motherwell F.C. players
Aberdeen F.C. players
Hamilton Academical F.C. players
Scottish Football League players
Scottish Football League representative players
Scotland amateur international footballers
Aberdeen F.C. wartime guest players
Motherwell F.C. wartime guest players
Seaforth Highlanders officers
British Army personnel of World War II